Henry Ludwig Duey (May 1, 1908 – February 13, 1993) was an American weightlifter and Olympic medalist. Duey was born in Chicago, Illinois. He won the bronze medal at the 1932 Summer Olympics in Los Angeles.

Career
In 1932 Olympics, Duey won the bronze medal in the light-heavyweight division with ease however, he was not close to beating the first and second place competitors. This was Duey's only medal that he had won in international competition.

Death
Duey died on February 13, 1993, at the age of 84 in Chipley, Florida.

References

External links
Henry Duey - Hall of Fame at Weightlifting Exchange

1908 births
1993 deaths
Sportspeople from Chicago
American male weightlifters
Weightlifters at the 1932 Summer Olympics
Olympic bronze medalists for the United States in weightlifting
Medalists at the 1932 Summer Olympics
20th-century American people